Jinder is both a surname and a given name. Notable people with the name include:

Surname:
Åsa Jinder (born 1963), Swedish folk musician
Little Jinder (born 1988), Swedish singer-songwriter, daughter of above

Given name:
Jinder (musician) (born 1981), English singer/songwriter and guitarist
Jinder Mahal (born 1986), Indo-Canadian professional wrestler